The Himalayan owl (Strix nivicolum), also known as the Himalayan wood owl, is an owl of the forests of the Asia, from the Himalayas to Korea and Taiwan. It is sometimes considered a subspecies of the tawny owl, but is separated from that species due to its distinctive call, darker plumage and shorter, barred tail.

References

Rasmussen, P.C., and J.C. Anderton. 2005. Birds of South Asia. The Ripley guide. Volume 2: attributes and status. Smithsonian Institution and Lynx Edicions, Washington D.C. and Barcelona.

Himalayan owl
Birds of the Himalayas
Birds of China
Himalayan owl
Himalayan owl